was an early Kamakura period military commander. A gokenin (retainer) of the Kamakura shogunate, he was the first director (bettō) of the Samurai-dokoro.

Life 
Wada Yoshimori was born as the son of Miura Yoshiaki and grandson of Sugimoto Yoshimune, making him a descendant of the Taira clan.

Yoshimori "was attached to Noriyori as his saburai daisho (general of soldiers)."  He fought in the battle of Ichi-no-Tani (1184).

He also fought in the Battle of Dan-no-ura, where he engaged Chikakiyo of Iyo in an archery duel.

Later, he participated in the campaign against Kiso Yoshinaka (1184) and Fujiwara Yasuhira (1189).

Among his sons were Wada Yoshinao, Asahina Yoshihide, and Wada Yoshishige. He also had a nephew, Wada Tanenaga.

Like many others, he and his family became victims of the struggle for power that followed the death of the first Kamakura shōgun Minamoto no Yoritomo. Tension had been growing between the Hōjō Regents and Wada, and open war started when Wada Yoshinao, Wada Yoshishige and Wada Tanenaga were accused of conspiracy and arrested. Yoshimori, who was in Kazusa, returned to Kamakura and managed to free his two sons. Tanenaga was however detained and exiled to Mutsu province. War ensued (the so-called ) and in 1213 he was defeated and killed together with his family. The Wada are traditionally supposed to be buried in the Wadazuka Mound in Kamakura, however this is only an unproven theory born after excavations in situ during the Meiji period.

References

Further reading
 

Wada, Yoshimori
Wada, Yoshimori
Wada, Yoshimori
Samurai